Kamala Bose (Bengali) (1947–2012) was a prominent Indian classical vocalist.

Biography
Kamala Bose (1947–2012) was an eminent vocalist in Hindustani Classical music based in Allahabad. She hails from a family that is deeply rooted in the field of performing and fine arts and boasts of a rich musical tradition.

Early life
She was initiated in this field by her father, the late J.D. Mazumdar, a reputed violinist and music composer with the All India Radio (AIR). It was from him that she received her initial training, and at the age of 5 she already started humming the songs she would hear.

In 1969, she came under the tutelage of the renowned vocalist, musicologist and teacher, Pt. Ramashray Jha of the Bhatt Gharana.

In 1977, she completed her master's degree from the Allahabad University, in Allahabad with a distinction in Music Vocal. She specialized in classical vocal or the khayal form, light classical i.e. Thumri, Dadra, Chaiti, Hori, Kajari etc., with great finesse.

Career
Bose commenced her musical journey in 1970 with All India Radio, Allahabad as an "A" grade artist of classical vocal music. Subsequently, she was appointed as a panellist in the Audition Board by The Director General, A.I.R, New Delhi.

Bose's proscenium experience was wide and impressive. She travelled and performed extensively in both India and abroad, participating in many major concerts, including the Sadarang Music Conference, Kolkata, Haridas Sangeet Sammelan, Mumbai, Sankat Mochan, Varanasi, Bangalore Sangeet Sabha, to name a few.

Talk show
The A.I.R. in "Sangeet Shiksha", a special feature of 26 episodes and the Gyan Vani Program on the FM Channel, comprising 10 episodes, invited her to disseminate her knowledge in classical music. Through them she unravelled and simplified both the basics as well as the complex aspects in the development of the ragas. A Head of the Music Department with the Allahabad Degree College, Allahabad, she had great command over the theoretical aspects of Indian Classical Music in addition to her mastery over the performing side. She successfully conducted many workshops and lecture cum demo sessions prominent among which are:
Lecture cum demo at the Sangeet Natak Academy, Lucknow in June 1993
Lecture cum demo at the Benaras Hindu University, Varanasi in February 2000
Lecture cum demo at Guwahati in November 2000, December 2001, June 2003 and June 2004.

Personal life
Kamala was married to Sri. Bichitra Mohan Bose and they have one son named Jayanto Bose and two daughters named Nabonita Mitra and JoitaBoseMandal.

Awards and recognitions
Apart from her immaculate renditions of khayal, bhajans, geet and Bengali raga based compositions, she earned a reputation of a complete musician.
Sur Singar Samsad, Mumbai honored her with the coveted title "Sur Mani".
Because of her genius and expertise in this performing art, the Director, Cultural Affairs, Government of Assam and Bengali Social & Cultural Association, Allahabad have honored her.

Performances
"Kal Ke Kalakar", organized by Sur Singar Samsad, Mumbai, 1971, 1982
Akhil Bharatiya Virat Sangeet Sammelan, Itawah, 1980
Lucknow Festival organized by the Cultural Department, Government of Uttar Pradesh, 1981
Swar Sadhana Samiti, Mumbai, 1982
Swami Haridas Sangeet Sammelan, Mumbai, 1982
Alauddin Khan Punya Tithi Samaroh, Varanasi, 1982
Sangeet Sammelan, Vidisha, 1982
Sangeet Sammelan, Bhopa, 1982
Sankat Mochan Sangeet Samaroh, Varanasi, 1983,1997
Ustad Faiyaz Khan Sangeet Sammelan, Agra, 1985
Bhuvaneshwar Sangeet Samaroh, Bhuvaneshwar, 1985
Avadh Sanskriti Kala Kendra, 1987
'Sadarang' Music Conference, Kolkata, 1988
Shastriya Sangeet Sabha by 'Kala Snehi', New Delhi, 1991
Bangalore Sangeet Sabha, 1993
Music Conference Ranchi, 1993
All India Nikhil Bharat Banga Sahitya Sammelan Adhiveshan, Allahabad,1996
'Ninad'at ABC Art Gallery, Varanasi,2000
Sangeet Nisha Gudai Maharaj Punya Tithi Samaroh, Varanasi,2000
Kashi Samaj Sangeet Sabha, Varanasi,2000
Music Conferences organized by Sangeet Sankalp of Delhi at Mumbai, Jaipur, Kota, Raipur and Kurukshetra.
Classical Vocal, Thumri & Bhajan Recital at North Central Zone Cultural Center, Allahabad.
All India Music Conference of the Prayag Sangeet Samiti, Allahabad, since 1971.
Baba Ramdas Jayanti Samaroh, Sonepur, Bihar, 2004

Bose has undertaken extensive foreign tours in US in 2009 and has also performed in France, Switzerland, Germany, Italy, Austria in 2003.
The Italian TV in 1998 and Swiss National Radio in 1999 have also recorded her.
Nandi Records released her first CD titled 'Reverberation' in 1998.

References

Kamala Bose, a well-known disciple of renowned musicologist, Pandit Ramashreya Jha.

Renowned sitar player Gaurav Mazumdar, a disciple of Kamala Bose

Kamala Bose, All India Radio Archives

Performance at All India Radio's National Program, 20 April 2008

Dr. Rashmi Malaviya Joshi, a disciple of Kamala Bose

External links
 

Hindustani singers
Indian women classical singers
1947 births
2012 deaths
Musicians from Mumbai
Indian women composers
20th-century Indian composers
Indian women musicologists
Indian musicologists
20th-century Indian educators
Women Hindustani musicians
20th-century Indian singers
Educators from Uttar Pradesh
Musicians from Allahabad
Women musicians from Uttar Pradesh
20th-century Indian women singers
Women educators from Uttar Pradesh
20th-century women composers
20th-century women educators